Hypsalonia merga is a species of spur-throated grasshoppers in the family Acrididae. It is found in North America.

References

 Capinera J.L, Scott R.D., Walker T.J. (2004). Field Guide to Grasshoppers, Katydids, and Crickets of the United States. Cornell University Press.
 Otte, Daniel (1995). "Grasshoppers [Acridomorpha] C". Orthoptera Species File 4, 518.

Further reading

 Arnett, Ross H. (2000). American Insects: A Handbook of the Insects of America North of Mexico. CRC Press.

Melanoplinae
Insects described in 1963